Gopalaswamy Mahendraraja (1956 – 28 December 1994), also known as Mahattaya was a member of Liberation Tigers of Tamil Eelam who was killed for leaking secrets to India's RAW.

Personal life 

Gopalaswamy Mahendraraja was related to Velupillai Prabhakaran, former LTTE leader. He was born in Point Pedro.

LTTE 

Mahattaya joined the LTTE in 1978. In 1987 he became the deputy leader of the LTTE, and in 1989 he became the head of the short-lived People's Front of Liberation Tigers, a political party founded by the LTTE. Mahattaya was the person who was leading most of the attacks done by LTTE when Prabhakaran was in India until 1986. Mahattaya was sent to Jaffna by Prabhakaran to inquire into the conflict matters that arose between LTTE and the University of Jaffna, in 1986, when a university student Vijetharan was kidnapped and killed by the Kittu group. Prabhakaran returned to Jaffna at the end of 1986. Mahattaya was second-in-command in the LTTE, at one time.

Athira, accused 18 in Rajiv Gandhi Assassination case confessed that she was ordered to collect intelligence in Tamil Nadu and hand it over to Mahattaya. Several investigative journalists proposed that Mahattaya might be the main Conspirator in Rajiv Gandhi Assassination, possibly worked as a mercenary.

Velupillai Prabhakaran and Pottu Amman found out that he was leaking information to India's RAW, which helped the Indian Peace Keeping Forces (IPKF) destroy LTTE bases. Mahattaya group was famous for doing all well planned attacks. In 1993, the LTTE took him into custody. He was executed on December 28, 1994, by the LTTE.

Further reading

References

External links 
Asia Times

Liberation Tigers of Tamil Eelam members
Sri Lankan Tamil rebels
Assassinated Sri Lankan people
1956 births
1994 deaths
People killed during the Sri Lankan Civil War
Assassination of Rajiv Gandhi
Research and Analysis Wing
Indian Peace Keeping Force
Sri Lankan spies
Indian spies